Henosepilachna is  a genus of beetle in the family Coccinellidae, including several pest species, such as the 28-spotted potato ladybird (which may refer to either Henosepilachna vigintioctomaculata, or Henosepilachna vigintioctopunctata).

Distribution
Species in this genus occur through much of Asia and Australasia, and one species, Henosepilachna vigintioctopunctata, has been accidentally introduced in other parts of the world (e.g., Brazil and Argentina).

Species
Henosepilachna altera (Dieke)
Henosepilachna argus (Geoffroy)
Henosepilachna bifasciata (Linnaeus)
Henosepilachna boisduvali (Mulsant)
Henosepilachna brittoni (Bielawski)
Henosepilachna dodecastigma (Wiedemann)
Henosepilachna enneasticta (Mulsant)
Henosepilachna haemorrhoa (Boisduval)
Henosepilachna indica (Mulsant)
Henosepilachna indistincta (Dieke)
Henosepilachna kabakovi Hoàng
Henosepilachna kaszabi (Bielawski & Fürsch)
Henosepilachna laokayensis Hoàng
Henosepilachna niponica (Lewis)
Henosepilachna ocellata (Redtenbacher)
Henosepilachna papuensis (Crotch)
Henosepilachna processa Li
Henosepilachna pusillanima (Mulsant)
Henosepilachna pustulosa (Kono)
Henosepilachna septima (Dieke)
Henosepilachna signatipennis (Boisduval)
Henosepilachna sumbana Bielawski
Henosepilachna vigintioctomaculata (Motschulsky)
Henosepilachna vigintioctopunctata (Fabricius)
Henosepilachna vigintisexpunctata (Boisduval)
Henosepilachna yasutomii Katakura

Former species
Henosepilachna elaterii (Rossi) (now in Chnootriba)
Henosepilachna guttatopustulata (Fabricius) (now in Papuaepilachna)

References

Coccinellidae
Coccinellidae genera
Agricultural pest insects